The ARY Film Award for Best Action is an ARY Film Award that is awarded each year to an action director for work in one particular motion picture. It is one of eleven awards in the technical awards category.

History
The Best Cinematography category originates with the 1st ARY Film Awards ceremony in 2014. The category has been given to the best action director for his/her work on films from the previous year to the ceremony held by jury selection.

Winners and nominees

As of 2014, no nominations were made; the winner selection and nomination were wholly made by the AFAS jury of Technical award.

2010s

References

External links 

 ARY Film Awards Official website

ARY Film Award winners
ARY Film Awards